The Acavoidea are a taxonomic superfamily of air-breathing land snails and slugs, terrestrial pulmonate gastropod mollusks in the informal group Sigmurethra.

This taxonomy was based on the study by Nordsieck, published in 1986.

Taxonomy
Families within the superfamily Acavoidea are as follows:
Family Acavidae  Pilsbry, 1895 
Family Caryodidae  Conolly, 1915 
Family Dorcasiidae  Conolly, 1915 
Family Macrocyclidae  Thiele, 1926 
Family Megomphicidae  H.B. Baker, 1930 
Family Strophocheilidae  Pilsbry, 1902

References

Stylommatophora
Gastropod superfamilies